Chris Quantock (born 31 March 1991) is an English professional darts player who plays in Professional Darts Corporation (PDC) events.

Known as "Quanny" or "The Bass", he has won two PDC Challenge Tour events, in 2015 and 2016, and a PDC Tour Card in 2017. He automatically qualified for the third round of the 2017 UK Open but was defeated 2–10 by Simon Whitlock.

Quantock's father, John Quantock, was also a darts player.

References

External links
Profile and statistics on Darts Database

1991 births
Living people
English darts players
Sportspeople from York
Professional Darts Corporation former tour card holders